Claudio Holenstein (born 10 September 1990) is a Swiss footballer who currently plays for SC Brühl.

References

1990 births
Living people
Swiss men's footballers
Swiss Super League players
Swiss Challenge League players
2. Liga (Austria) players
FC Wil players
FC Gossau players
FC Luzern players
FC Wohlen players
FC Winterthur players
FC Wacker Innsbruck (2002) players
Swiss expatriate footballers
Expatriate footballers in Austria
Swiss expatriate sportspeople in Austria
Association football midfielders
People from Wil
Sportspeople from the canton of St. Gallen